Zbigniew Gutkowski is a Polish professional offshore sailor born on 24 June 1973 in Gdansk.

Biography
From 2012,he is the skipper of the IMOCA Energa. On 21 November 2012, he announced that he was abandoning the Vendée Globe 2012-2013 due to electronic problems in his sailboat, preventing him from having an autopilot

Sailing Career Highlights
2013
 3rd Caribbean 600
 7th Transat Jacques-Vabre 2013 with Maciej Marczewski
2012
 RET in the 2012-2013 Vendée Globe (Energa)
2010
 2nd in the Velux 5 Oceans
2005
 4th in the Nokia Oops Cup (ORMA 60 Bonduelle)
2004
 Attempted world record (Volvo Ocean 60 Bank BHP, ex-Assa Abloy), stop in Cape Town after hardware failure
2001
 4th of The Race (watch leader on Warta-Polpharma)

References

External links
 

1973 births
Living people
Polish male sailors (sport)
Sportspeople from Gdańsk
IMOCA 60 class sailors
Polish Vendee Globe sailors
2012 Vendee Globe sailors